"Hit the Quan" is the debut single by American rapper iLoveMemphis. This song is based around a dance that was first made popular by American rapper Rich Homie Quan. It peaked at number 15 on the Billboard Hot 100.

Background and release
Hit the Quan was a dance that was originally performed by Rich Homie Quan in his video for the song "Flex (Ooh, Ooh, Ooh)" which was released in April 2015. The dance Rich Homie Quan did in the video soon became a hit with numerous Vines being produced portraying the dance. At that time, most people referred to the dance routine as simply the "Rich Homie Quan" dance. In July 2015, 3 months following the release of the song, iLoveMemphis released a song titled "Hit The Quan" which then became popular. He said that he spent $35 on making the song.

Music video
The song's accompanying music video premiered on November 12, 2015 on his Vevo account on YouTube.

Commercial performance
"Hit the Quan" debuted at number 41 on the Billboard Hot 100 for the chart dated September 5, 2015. It peaked at number 15 on the chart, becoming iHeartMemphis' only top 40 entry on the chart. As of November 2015, the song has sold 498,000 copies domestically. It was certified Platinum by the RIAA on December 18, 2015.

Live performances
On November 2, 2015, iLoveMemphis made his television debut on The Ellen DeGeneres Show performing "Hit the Quan".

Charts

Weekly charts

Year-end charts

Certifications

References

External links

2015 debut singles
2015 songs
American hip hop songs
Songs about dancing
Novelty and fad dances